Betty Boop's Rise to Fame is a 1934 Fleischer Studios animated short film, starring Betty Boop.

Plot
In a live action sequence, a reporter interviewing Max Fleischer asks him about Betty Boop. Max obligingly draws Betty "out of the inkwell" and asks her to perform a couple of numbers. Song and dance numbers from Stopping the Show, Betty Boop's Bamboo Isle, and The Old Man of the Mountain are used.

In the end, Betty jumps back into the inkwell, accidentally splashing ink into the reporter's face.

References

External links
 Betty Boop's Rise to Fame on YouTube.
 Betty Boop's Rise to Fame on archive.org.
 

1934 short films
1934 musical films
Betty Boop cartoons
1930s American animated films
American black-and-white films
1934 animated films
Paramount Pictures short films
Fleischer Studios short films
Short films directed by Dave Fleischer
Short films with live action and animation
Cultural depictions of Maurice Chevalier
American musical films
1930s English-language films
American animated short films
Films about animation